Uralla-Walcha was an electoral district of the Legislative Assembly in the Australian state of New South Wales, including the towns of Uralla and Walcha. It was originally created in 1894, when multi-member districts were abolished, and the three member district of New England was largely divided between Uralla-Walcha, Armidale and Bingara. The district was abolished in 1904 as a result of the 1903 New South Wales referendum, which reduced the number of members of the Legislative Assembly from 125 to 90, and was divided between Armidale and Bingara.

Members for Uralla-Walcha

Election results

References

Former electoral districts of New South Wales
Constituencies established in 1894
1894 establishments in Australia
Constituencies disestablished in 1904
1904 disestablishments in Australia